829 Naval Air Squadron was a squadron of the Royal Navy Fleet Air Arm. Before it was decommissioned in March 2018, it operated the AgustaWestland Merlin HM2 helicopter.

History

1940–1942
829 Naval Air Squadron first formed on 15 June 1940 as a torpedo and reconnaissance squadron at Royal Naval Air Station (RNAS) Ford, Sussex, UK, and equipped with nine Fairey Albacore torpedo bombers. In October, it began nightly bombing attacks from RNAS St. Eval, Cornwall, on German shipping and docks at Brest, France. During these attacks, the commanding officer of 829 NAS L/C OS Stevinson and crew was lost on 9 October 1940. In the next month, the squadron was assigned to the aircraft carrier , which then sailed to escort the convoy WS-5A to West Africa and Cape Town. Part of the convoy came into contact with the German heavy cruiser , but the aircraft of 829 NAS failed to sight her. Leaving Cape Town in January 1941, HMS Formidable sailed for the Red Sea, where her aircraft carried out attacks on the Italian-held cities of Mogadishu and Massawa in February. After a passage through the Suez Canal, the squadron had to be partially re-equipped with Fairey Swordfish due to losses.

During the Battle of Matapan, late in March, one of the squadron's Albacores scored a hit on the Italian battleship , where the squadron CO Lt. Cdr. John Dalyell-Stead was shot down and killed. Further activities in the Mediterranean involved an attack on an Italian airfield on Karpathos, the second largest of the Greek Dodecanese islands, at the end of May, after which the aircraft operated from Lod for some time, attacking Vichy French shipping during the Syria-Lebanon campaign. However, on 26 May 1941, HMS Formidable received serious damage while transporting aircraft to Malta, being hit by two German  bombs that put her out of action for six months. 829 NAS was stationed in June on Cyprus where all Albacores were left when the carrier sailed for repairs at Norfolk Naval Shipyard (U.S.) in July 1941. Six of the squadron's Swordfish provided anti-submarine patrols whilst the carrier was en route for repairs in the U.S., by way of Cape Town.

After being put ashore in Jamaica, 829 NAS joined  for passage to Norfolk, Virginia (U.S.), before rejoining the repaired HMS Formidable to return to Great Britain. There the squadron received 12 new ASV-equipped Swordfish Mk.II, with which it rejoined HMS Illustrious in March 1942. Sailing by way of Cape Town, 829 NAS took part in an attack on Diego Suarez during the invasion of Madagascar In May. Successful attacks were carried out on the Vichy French submarines Bėvėziers and Le Hėros, and also a sloop and an escort ship, for the loss of five aircraft. Airborne support was provided in September for attacks on the remaining Vichy troops in south Madagascar. Following this, HMS Illustrious sailed to Durban for a refit, and whilst there 829 NAS was amalgamated with 810 Naval Air Squadron at Stamford Hill airfield (near Durban) on 7 October 1942.

1943–1944
On 1 October 1943, 829 NAS was reformed as a torpedo bomber reconnaissance squadron at RNAS Lee-on-the-Solent, flying twelve Fairey Barracuda MK.II as part of the 52nd Naval TBR Wing. After an abortive attempt to carry out a similar attack in May, attacks were made on shipping off Norway, but on 9 July 1944 829 NAS was amalgamated with 831 Naval Air Squadron on HMS Victorious and ceased to exist.

1964–1994
829 was reformed at RNAS Culdrose, Cornwall (UK), on 4 March 1964. The squadron was formed from a nucleus of No. 700W Flight, which was the training unit for Westland Wasp helicopter crews. Its task was to provide helicopter detachments to operate from small ships and survey vessels, the Wasp HAS1 performing in the role of a medium-range anti-submarine torpedo-carrying helicopter.

The squadron also took over the responsibility for the Westland Wessex HAS1 helicopters operating from s. In 1969, the HAS1 was replaced by the Wessex HAS3. In December 1964, 829 NAS handed over the task of Wasp conversion to 706 Naval Air Squadron, and was relocated to RNAS Portland, Dorset. Until the Wasp was retired in 1988, the squadron remained responsible for all Wasp-equipped Ship's Flights. This led to several Wasps from the squadron, re-painted as a fictional HMS Hero Flight, being used in the popular 1970s BBC television drama series Warship.

When 771 Naval Air Squadron was disbanded in January 1965, 829 NAS also received Westland Whirlwind helicopters returning them when 771 NAS reformed in June 1967. Responsibility for the ice patrol ship  was also taken over in 1966, initially using Whirlwind HAR1s. In June 1970, responsibility for small ships' Wessex helicopters was transferred to 737 Naval Air Squadron at RNAS Portland.

A further restructuring took place in January 1972 when 703 Naval Air Squadron was established at RNAS Portland to take over the Wasp conversion and operational flying training role. This task was reassigned to 829 NAS in January 1981. In August 1982, the operation of Wessex HAS3 anti-submarine detachments was returned to 737 NAS.

Falklands War
Eleven Westland Wasp HAS1 helicopters of 829 NAS participated in the Falklands War in 1982. The Wessex then attacked it with depth charges.  launched a Wasp HAS1 helicopter, and  launched a Westland Lynx HAS2. The Lynx attacked the submarine with a MK 46 torpedo, and also strafed it with its pintle-mounted GPMG; the Wessex also fired on Santa Fe with its GPMG. The Wasp from HMS Plymouth as well as two other Wasps launched from Endurance fired AS.12 anti-ship missiles at the submarine, scoring hits. Santa Fe was damaged badly enough to prevent her from submerging. The crew abandoned the submarine at the jetty at King Edward Point on South Georgia and surrendered to the British forces, thus becoming the first casualty of the sea war, as well as the first direct engagement by the Royal Navy Task Force.

The last Wasp was finally withdrawn from service in 1988 when the last of the Type 12 Rothesay-class frigates was decommissioned. Starting in September 1986 829 NAS had already received a number of Westland Lynx HAS2 detachments transferred from 815 Naval Air Squadron. In 1988 the squadron eventually had up to 30 Lynx. Flights were regularly deployed on the Armilla patrol in the Persian Gulf. The squadron was awarded the "Boyd Trophy" jointly with 815 NAS for their service in the Persian Gulf.

Persian Gulf War
Between August 1990 and February 1991, several flights of 829 NAS participated in the Persian Gulf War. Six Lynx helicopters armed with Sea Skua missiles were sent from 829 NAS to the Gulf on four Royal Navy frigates.

The first success came when Lynx 335 from —together with an American Seahawk—came across and destroyed a minesweeper or landing vessel. Lynx 335—along with 's Lynx and U.S. forces—subsequently also destroyed two Iraqi anti-aircraft artillery batteries mounted on offshore oil rigs off Kuwait. On 24 January 1991, Lynx 335 attacked three Iraqi vessels off the island of Quarah, sinking two minesweepers. Lynx 335 also attempted to capture a minelayer, but she was scuttled by her Iraqi crew. Quarah was later captured by coalition forces, becoming the first Iraqi territory to be liberated.

On 29 January, Royal Navy helicopters spotted a flotilla of 17 Iraqi landing craft, part of an attempted amphibious assault in support of the Iraqi forces engaged in the Battle of Khafji.

On 30 January, a convoy consisting of three Polnochny-class landing ships, three TNC-45 fast-attack craft and a single Type 43 minelayer was attacked. HMS Gloucesters Lynx destroyed a TNC-45, while Cardiff and Brazens Lynxes attacked the Type 43. Other units were also damaged, including a Polnochny that was later destroyed by RAF SEPECAT Jaguars. On 8 February, Lynx 335 attacked a Zhuk-class patrol boat, and on 11 February, the same helicopter sank another Zhuk.

In total, Lynx helicopters from 829 NAS were responsible for 15 Iraqi ships sunk in the war, at least five of which were sunk by a single helicopter, Lynx 335.

The Squadron was disbanded on 26 March 1993, when all its Lynx Flights were absorbed by 815 NAS.

2004–2013

The remaining four Type 23 frigates operate Westland Lynx HMA.8s of 815 Naval Air Squadron.

As of 2012 829 NAS has five ship's flights in support of six Type 23 frigates.

2013 to 2018 (now disbanded)
The squadron took on Merlin HM.2 and operated from mainly Type 23 frigates.
 01 Flight: Aboard  between November 2015 and present day
 03 Flight: Aboard  during October 2015.
 04 Flight: Aboard  during November 2014.
04 Flight became 02 Flight in May 2016.

In December 2017, the three Flights were renamed to reflect Squadron heritage: 01 Flight became TUNGSTEN Flight; 02 Flight became KINGFISHER Flight; and 03 Flight became MOHAWK Flight.

At the time of decommissioning, the Flights were assigned to: 
 TUNGSTEN Flight         HMS St Albans
 KINGFISHER Flight       HMS Westminster  
 MOHAWK Flight           HMS Northumberland 
The squadron decommissioned on 28 March 2018, with the unit's aircraft and personnel becoming part of 814 Naval Air Squadron, also based at RNAS Culdrose.

Aircraft operated
The squadron operated a variety of different aircraft and marks of aircraft:
 Fairey Albacore I
 Fairey Swordfish I & II(ASV)
 Fairey Barracuda II
 Westland Whirlwind HAR.1, HAS.7 & HAR.9
 Westland Wasp HAS.1
 Westland Wessex HAS.1, HAS.3 & HU.5
 Westland Lynx HAS.2, HAS.3, HAS.3 (CTS) & HMA.8
 AgustaWestland Merlin HM.1 & HM.2

Commanding Officers 
 Lt Cdr J P S Greenop              April 1987 - July 1989
 Lt Cdr M R Legg                      July 1989 - June 1990
 Lt Cdr B B Leyshon                 June 1990 - May 1992
 Lt Cdr P A McKay                    May 1992 - Mar 1993
 Lt Cdr P R J Munro-Lott          August 2004 - December 2005
 Lt Cdr S Deacon                     December 2005 - August 2006
 Lt Cdr D Goldsmith                 August 2006 - July 2008
 Lt Cdr B Franklin                    July 2008 - June 2009
 Cdr B Franklin                        June 2009 - October 2009
 Lt Cdr / Cdr M A E Bravery    October 2009 - January 2012
 Lt Cdr / Cdr S Windebank      January 2012 - February 2014
 Lt Cdr P R Beacham              February 2014 - May 2016
 Lt Cdr / Cdr K Burbidge         May 2016 - March 2018

References

Citations

Bibliography

External links

800 series Fleet Air Arm squadrons
Military units and formations of the United Kingdom in the Falklands War
Military of the United Kingdom in Cornwall